KRWL may refer to:

 KRWL-LP, a low-power radio station (97.7 FM) licensed to serve Coquille, Oregon, United States
 Rawlins Municipal Airport (ICAO code KRWL)